Gastrotheca guentheri (common names: Guenther's marsupial frog, dentate marsupial frog) is a species of frog in the family Hemiphractidae.
It is found in the Andes of Colombia (Cordillera Occidental and Colombian Massif) and Ecuador (Cordillera Occidental). Gastrotheca guentheri is the only known frog with true teeth in both of its jaws, as indicated by the name of the genus it originally typified, Amphignathodon, described by George Albert Boulenger in 1882.

Description
Gastrotheca guentheri is the only known frog with true teeth in its lower jaw. Its teeth have re-evolved after being absent for over 200 million years, challenging Dollo's law. Re-evolution of teeth in the lower jaw may have been made easier because the frogs have teeth in their upper jaw so there was already a biochemical pathway for developing teeth after 200 million years, unlike, say, birds. Biochemically, this may be an example of a suppressor of a regulatory gene disappearing.

Males measure  and females  in snout–vent length.

Habitat and conservation
Natural habitats of Gastrotheca guentheri are tropical moist forests. These frogs are nocturnal and live on vegetation, including arboreal bromeliads.

This species is declining in abundance. One cause of the declines is habitat loss, but the species has also declined within suitable habitat in Ecuador, possibly because of climate change or chytridiomycosis.

References

External links
Discover life: Hylidae - Treefrogs
Breathing Space: Gastrotheca guentheri

guentheri
Amphibians of the Andes
Amphibians of Colombia
Amphibians of Ecuador
Amphibians described in 1882
Taxonomy articles created by Polbot
Taxa named by George Albert Boulenger